The following are the Pulitzer Prizes for 1991. The year was significant because not only were awards given for all categories, but two separate awards were given for International Reporting.

Journalism awards 
Public Service:
Des Moines Register, For reporting by Jane Schorer that, with the victim's consent, named a woman who had been raped—which prompt widespread reconsideration of the traditional media practice of concealing the identity of rape victims.
Spot News Reporting:
Staff of The Miami Herald, For stories profiling a local cult leader, his followers, and their links to several area murders.
Investigative Reporting:
Joseph T. Hallinan and Susan M. Headden of The Indianapolis Star, For their shocking series on medical malpractice in the state.
Explanatory Journalism:
Susan C. Faludi of The Wall Street Journal, For a report on the leveraged buy-out of Safeway Stores, Inc., that revealed the human costs of high finance.
Beat Reporting:
Natalie Angier of The New York Times, For her compelling and illuminating reports on a variety of scientific topics.
National Reporting:
Marjie Lundstrom and Rochelle Sharpe of Gannett News Service, For reporting that disclosed hundreds of child abuse-related deaths go undetected each year as a result of errors by medical examiners.
International Reporting:
Serge Schmemann of The New York Times, For his coverage of the reunification of Germany.
International Reporting:
Caryle Murphy of The Washington Post, For her dispatches from occupied Kuwait, some of which she filed while in hiding from Iraqi authorities.
Feature Writing:
Sheryl James of the St. Petersburg Times, For a compelling series about a mother who abandoned her newborn child and how it affected her life and those of others.
Commentary:
Jim Hoagland of The Washington Post, For searching and prescient columns on events leading up to the Gulf War and on the political problems of Mikhail Gorbachev.
Criticism:
David Shaw of the Los Angeles Times, For his critiques of the way in which the media, including his own paper, reported the McMartin Pre-School child molestation case.
Editorial Writing:
Ron Casey, Harold Jackson and Joey Kennedy of The Birmingham News, For their editorial campaign analyzing inequities in Alabama's tax system and proposing needed reforms.
Editorial Cartooning:
Jim Borgman of The Cincinnati Enquirer
Spot News Photography:
Greg Marinovich of Associated Press, For a series of photographs of supporters of South Africa's African National Congress brutally murdering a man they believed to be a Zulu spy.
Feature Photography:
William Snyder of The Dallas Morning News, For his photographs of ill and orphaned children living in subhuman conditions in Romania.

Letters awards 
Fiction:
Rabbit At Rest by John Updike (Alfred A. Knopf)
History:
A Midwife's Tale by Laurel Thatcher Ulrich (Alfred A. Knopf)
Biography or Autobiography:
Jackson Pollock: An American Saga by Steven Naifeh and Gregory White Smith (Clarkson N. Potter)
Poetry:
Near Changes by Mona Van Duyn (Alfred A. Knopf)
General Non-Fiction:
The Ants by Bert Holldobler and Edward O. Wilson (Belknap/Harvard University Press)

Arts awards 
Drama:
Lost in Yonkers by Neil Simon (Random House)
Music:
Symphony by Shulamit Ran (Theodore Presser Company)
Commissioned by The Philadelphia Orchestra and premiered by that orchestra on October 19, 1990.

References

External links
 

Pulitzer Prize
Pulitzer Prizes by year
Pulitzer Prize